Amir Alberto Waithe Nuñez (born 27 November 1989) is a Panamanian football player, most recently playing for Liga Panameña de Fútbol club Plaza Amador.

Club career
He started his career at San Francisco and in February 2011 was apparently sent on loan to Costa Rican giants Alajuelense, only to return to Panama 12 days later after Liga decided his trial period was not successful. 

In January 2012, he returned from abroad again to San Francisco after he failed a trial at Slovak club FK Senica who appeared only eager to sign compatriot Rolando Blackburn. Waithe did not renew his contract with San Francisco in December 2014 and left the club after 10 seasons and winning three league titles. He then scored the first goal of the 2015 Clausura season for Tauro in a 1-1 draw against his former club San Francisco.

International career
Waithe made his debut for Panama in March 2010 friendly match against Venezuela and has, as of 15 August 2015, earned a total of 7 caps, scoring 2 goals. He represented his country in 2 FIFA World Cup qualification matches.

International goals
Scores and results list Panama's goal tally first.

References

External links

1989 births
Living people
Sportspeople from Panama City
Association football forwards
Panamanian footballers
Panamanian expatriate footballers
San Francisco F.C. players
A.D. Carmelita footballers
Tauro F.C. players
C.D. Plaza Amador players
Liga Panameña de Fútbol players
Liga FPD players
Panamanian expatriate sportspeople in Costa Rica
Expatriate footballers in Costa Rica
Panama international footballers